Marcel Felder (born 9 July 1984) is a Uruguayan professional tennis player. His highest ranking in singles was No. 227 on 28 December 2009. His highest ranking in doubles was 82 on 11 June 2012. Felder won a gold medal in singles in men's tennis at the 2013 Maccabiah Games in Israel.

Tennis career
The right-hander achieved career high rankings of World No. 227 in singles in 2009, and No. 82 in doubles in 2012.  In Davis Cup play, through September 2013 he was 21–14 in singles and 12–10 in doubles.  As of September 2013, he held the Uruguay record for most Davis Cup wins in doubles.

His father is Geraldo, and his mother is Judith.  He has a brother named Andres, and a sister, Celine.  Felder began playing tennis at four years of age.

As a junior, his career-high rankings were # 4 in singles, and # 5 in doubles, both in 2002.

In February 2007 he played for the Uruguay Davis Cup team against Jamaica.

After testing positive for cannabis in 2007, Felder was banned for two months.

Felder won a gold medal in singles in men's tennis at the 2013 Maccabiah Games in Israel.

ATP Challenger and ITF Futures finals

Singles: 27 (17–10)

Doubles: 51 (31–20)

See also
List of notable Jewish tennis players

References

External links
 
 
 
 

Uruguayan male tennis players
Sportspeople from Montevideo
Uruguayan people of German-Jewish descent
Uruguayan Jews
Jewish tennis players
Living people
1984 births
Maccabiah Games medalists in tennis
Maccabiah Games gold medalists for Uruguay
Competitors at the 2013 Maccabiah Games
Doping cases in tennis
South American Games medalists in tennis
South American Games gold medalists for Uruguay
Competitors at the 2002 South American Games
Tennis players at the 2007 Pan American Games
Tennis players at the 2003 Pan American Games
Pan American Games competitors for Uruguay
20th-century Uruguayan people
21st-century Uruguayan people